Ross Stores, Inc., operating under the brand name Ross Dress for Less, is an American chain of discount department stores headquartered in Dublin, California. It is the largest off-price retailer in the U.S.; as of 2018, Ross operates 1,483 stores in 37 U.S. states, the District of Columbia and Guam, covering much of the country, but with no presence in New York, northern New Jersey, Alaska, Puerto Rico, and areas of the Midwest.

History

Ross Department Store was first opened in San Bruno, California, in 1950 by Morris "Morrie" Ross. Morris would work 85 hours a week doing all of the buying and bookkeeping for his department store. In 1958 Ross sold his store to William Isackson to become a residential and commercial real estate developer. Isackson built the company to six stores, located in San Bruno, Pacifica, Novato, Vacaville, Redwood City, and Castro Valley. In 1982 a group of investors, including Mervin Morris, founder of the Mervyn's chain of department stores, purchased the six Ross Department Stores in San Francisco, changed the format to off-price retail units, and within three years rapidly expanded the chain to 107 stores under Stuart Moldaw and Don Rowlett. By the end of 1995 the chain reached an annual sales of $1.4 billion with 292 stores in 18 states. By 2012 Ross reached $9.7 billion for the fiscal year with 1,091 stores in 33 states with an additional 108 for Dd's Discounts in 8 states. Ross moved its headquarters from Newark to Pleasanton, California, in the Tri-Valley area, in 2003.

Barbara Rentler took the place of CEO Michael Balmuth on June 1, 2014; she was the 25th female CEO of a Fortune 500 company. Ross moved its headquarters from Pleasanton to neighboring Dublin, California, in 2014.

Ross Stores opened 28 new locations in July 2019 with the chain having 1,523 stores and operating 249 Dd's Discounts in 39 states, the District of Columbia, and Guam.

See also

Burlington
Marshalls
T.J.Maxx
Walmart
Target Corporation

References

External links

Official website

Clothing retailers of the United States
American companies established in 1950
Retail companies established in 1950
Discount stores of the United States
Companies based in Alameda County, California
Dublin, California
Companies listed on the Nasdaq
1950 establishments in California